Bilall Yamout is a Lebanese swimmer. He competed in two events at the 1980 Summer Olympics.

References

Year of birth missing (living people)
Living people
Lebanese male swimmers
Olympic swimmers of Lebanon
Swimmers at the 1980 Summer Olympics
Place of birth missing (living people)